John McKean (6 January 1869 – 14 May 1942) was an Irish nationalist politician and Member of Parliament (MP) in the House of Commons of the United Kingdom of Great Britain and Ireland.

He was first elected unopposed as the Irish Parliamentary Party (IPP) MP for the South Monaghan constituency at the 1902 South Monaghan by-election, caused by the resignation of James Daly. He was re-elected at the 1906, January 1910 and December 1910 general elections. From 1909, having left the IPP, he sat as an Independent Nationalist MP. He did not contest the 1918 general election.

External links

 

1869 births
1942 deaths
Irish Parliamentary Party MPs
Independent Nationalist MPs
Members of the Parliament of the United Kingdom for County Monaghan constituencies (1801–1922)
UK MPs 1900–1906
UK MPs 1906–1910
UK MPs 1910
UK MPs 1910–1918
Politicians from County Monaghan